National Council for Teacher Education Act, 1993 is an Act of the Parliament of India which gave statutory recognition to the National Council for Teacher Education. and subsequently passed.

Objective
The objective of the bill, according to the government, was to "provide for the establishment of a National Council for Teacher Education" as a separate body rather than as just an advisory department, a role the council had held since its inception in 1976.

References

Acts of the Parliament of India 1993
1993 in law
1993 in India
Teacher education in India
Education law in India
1993 in education
Rao administration